George B. Moffat Jr. is an author, twice world champion glider pilot, and a member of the U.S. Soaring Hall of Fame. He began flying airplanes in 1953, gliders in 1959, entered his first national soaring competition in 1962, and was still an active competition pilot as of 2008. Before competing in sailplanes, he compiled a winning record in International 14 foot Dinghy racing and is still an active sailor.

He was the first pilot ever to win the Open Class title twice in the World Gliding Championships, has won five U.S. National championships, and is one of only two pilots to have won the U.S. national title in all three glider competition classes (Open, Standard and 15-meter). A holder of the Lillienthal Medal, the highest award in gliding, he has flown competitively in over eight countries.

Biography
George Moffat is one of America's foremost competition pilots and has been soaring since 1958. Aside from winning several Nationals dating from 1969, and setting three triangle speed records, he won the world title in 1970 and 1974.

After only a few days to become acquainted with the prototype Schempp-Hirth Nimbus he flew it in the 1970 World Gliding Championships at Marfa, Texas. He had to modify the aircraft's cockpit to fit in, and became the first person to sample its spin characteristics when, in mid-competition, the glider departed from a steep turn into autorotation. While considering bailing out, he remembered that the spin of the similar Akaflieg Darmstadt D36 could be tamed by rocking the stick back and forth violently. Flexing the wings caused the angle of attack to change and recovery eventually ensued. In spite of these difficulties, Moffat and the Nimbus won the World Championship.

In 1974, he wrote "Winning on the Wind". He placed first in the 1975 Smirnoff Transcontinental Sailplane Race, and won the Coupe d'Europe European Sailplane Championship in 1977 at Angers, France.

He is an enthusiastic sailor, winning the Eastern High Point Trophy three times, and the Douglass Trophy for match racing against Canada. He has written about 85 articles on soaring and sailing in publications such as Yachting, Soaring, Sailplane & Gliding, and Popular Science.  He holds an MA from Penn, taught at Rutgers Preparatory School (Somerset, New Jersey), Rutgers University (New Brunswick, New Jersey), and was head of the English Dept. at Pingry School (currently two NJ campuses).

Moffat's victory in the 1969 US National Soaring Championship is chronicled in the 1971 film The Sun Ship Game by cinéma vérité filmmaker Robert Drew and his 1974 victory at the World Gliding Championships at Waikerie in South Australia was captured in the film of the championships Zulu Romeo – Good Start.

George Moffat lives in Marion, Massachusetts.

World glider records
Single-place glider
Speed over a triangular course of 100 km: 128.38 km/h, 16 August 1962, El Mirage Dry Lake, Schreder HP-8
Speed over a triangular course of 300 km: 108.12 km/h, 19 August 1962, El Mirage Dry Lake, Schreder HP-8
Speed over a triangular course of 300 km: 119.87 km/h, 6 August 1964, Odessa, Texas, Schreder HP-8
Source: Fédération Aéronautique Internationale

Championships

World championships
 1970 Marfa, Texas, Open Class, Schempp-Hirth Nimbus
 1974 Waikerie, South Australia, Open Class, Schempp-Hirth Nimbus-2

International championships
 1975 Smirnoff Transcontinental Derby, Eiri-Avion PIK-20
 1977 European Championships, 15 meter class, Schempp-Hirth Mini-Nimbus

Other flying accomplishments
 Lilienthal Gliding Medal, 1977
 FAI Challenge Cup 1970, 1974
 Exceptional Service Award 1999
 Exceptional Achievement Award 1966, 1970, 1973
 Barnaby Lecture 2001
 du Pont Trophy 1969, 1973, 1982
 Stroukoff Trophy 1966, 1982
 Standard Class Trophy 1970
 Schreder 15-Meter Trophy 1978
 FAI Diamond #44 (Int #449) 1965

Source: Soaring Hall of Fame

Books authored
 1975, Winning on the Wind, The Soaring Press, Los Altos, California. Library of Congress Catalog Card No. 74-82783
 2005, Winning II: new perspectives, Julian, Pennsylvania: Knauff & Grove.

References

External links
 Biography in the magazine of the Soaring Association of Canada Free Flight June/July 2002
'Red Baron In The Wild Blue Yonder',  Taken from the Sports Illustrated archive website.

Possibly living people
American aviators
American aviation writers
Gliding in the United States
Glider flight record holders
Glider pilots
1927 births
People from Marion, Massachusetts
Lilienthal Gliding Medal recipients
American aviation record holders